Xatcobeo, originally known as Dieste, is a project to build the first Galician artificial satellite developed by Agrupación Estratéxica Aeroespacial (currently Alén Space) of the University of Vigo and leadered by Fernando Aguado in collaboration with the Instituto Nacional de Técnica Aeroespacial (INTA) and with the support of the Galician government-owned corporation Retegal. The project was presented to the European Space Agency for its launch in the inaugural flight of the Vega rocket from the Guiana Space Centre, in Kourou (French Guiana). Its life will be between 6 and 12 months, and its cost will be around 1.2 million euros, being 50% funded by the Ministerio de Ciencia e Investigación of Spain, 25% by Retegal and in the last 25% jointly by the University of Vigo and INTA.

It is a Cubesat-type satellite and its objective will be to do research related with communications and with solar power in satellites.

See also 

List of CubeSats

External links 
Xatcobeo Web
 Department of Signal Theory and Communications (TSC) Web
 Laboratory of Applied Computer Science (LIA) Web 
 National Institute of Aerospace Technology (INTA) Web
 Superior Technical School of Telecommunication Engineering Web
 Superior Technical School of Computer Science Engineering Web
 University of Vigo Web
European Space Agency Website: "Meet the teams: Xatcobeo"
Xatcobeo - eoPortal Directory - Satellite Missions

References 

Science and technology in Galicia (Spain)
Student satellites
CubeSats
Satellites of Spain
Spacecraft launched in 2012
Spacecraft launched by Vega rockets
2012 in Spain
INTA satellites